Krzyżanowice  (German Kreuzenort) is a village in Racibórz County, Silesian Voivodeship, in southern Poland, close to the Czech border. It is the seat of the gmina (administrative district) called Gmina Krzyżanowice.

The village has an approximate population of 2,100.

Notable people

 Karl Max, Prince Lichnowsky (1860–1928) a German diplomat who served as Ambassador to Britain during the July Crisis in 1914

References

Villages in Racibórz County